The baritone sarrusophone is the baritone member of the sarrusophone family of metal double reed conical bore wind instruments. Sometimes colloquially known as the combat bassoon, it is pitched in E♭ and has the same range as the baritone saxophone, and is about the same height as a bassoon. Its body is wrapped around only once, whereas the contrabass sarrusophone wraps around twice.

Historically it was built in the late 19th and early 20th centuries principally by its inventor Gautrot and his successor Couesnon & Co., as well as Evette & Schaeffer (now Buffet Crampon) and Orsi of Milan.

It is currently only made to order, by Orsi and the German instrument maker Benedikt Eppelsheim.

See also
Sarrusophone

References

Single oboes with conical bore
Sarrusophones